The German Congo Expedition was conducted by the German African Association from 1884 - 1886.

The expedition left Hamburg in April 1884 under the command of Lieutenant Eduard Shulze. At Gabon, the botanist, Richard Büttner, was left to attend to the coffee plantation of Dr Soyaux

References

1884 in Germany
1885 in Germany
1886 in Germany
History of Gabon